Robert Kilgour Thom was  Dean of Brechin from 1861 until 1874; he was also the incumbent of Drumlithie.

Notes

Scottish Episcopalian clergy
Deans of Brechin
19th-century Scottish clergy
Year of birth missing
Year of death missing